Joseph Anthony Greenaway Jr. (born November 16, 1957) is an American lawyer who serves as a United States circuit judge of the United States Court of Appeals for the Third Circuit and previously sat on the United States District Court for the District of New Jersey. On February 9, 2010, he was confirmed to his seat on the Third Circuit, filling the vacancy created by Justice Samuel Alito's elevation to the United States Supreme Court. Greenaway had been mentioned as a possible candidate for the Supreme Court by President Barack Obama.

Early life and education 

Greenaway was born of West Indian parents in London, England, and immigrated to the United States at the age of two.  His father is a carpenter and his mother is a nurse.

Greenaway was on the varsity baseball team at the Bronx High School of Science, from which he graduated in 1974. Greenaway earned a Bachelors of Arts degree from Columbia University in 1978 and a Juris Doctor from Harvard Law School in 1981. From 1982 until 1983, he worked as a law clerk for Judge Vincent Lyons Broderick of the United States District Court for the Southern District of New York.

Legal and academic career 

Greenaway worked in private practice in New York City from 1981 until 1985. He became an Assistant United States Attorney at the U.S. Attorney's Office for the District of New Jersey from 1985–1989, when he became the chief of narcotics for the District of New Jersey. From 1990–1996, Greenaway worked as in-house counsel for Johnson & Johnson in New Brunswick, New Jersey. From 2002–2006, Greenaway was an adjunct professor at Rutgers School of Law in Newark, New Jersey. He is an adjunct professor at Cardozo School of Law where he teaches a course on trial practice and a seminar on the Supreme Court as well as an adjunct at Columbia University, where he also teaches a seminar on the Supreme Court. Since 2018, he has been a lecturer on law at Harvard Law School.

Federal judicial service

District court service 

Greenaway was nominated by President Bill Clinton on November 27, 1995, to a seat on the United States District Court for the District of New Jersey vacated by Judge John F. Gerry. He was confirmed by the United States Senate by voice vote on July 16, 1996, and received commission on July 26, 1996. His service terminated on February 24, 2010, due to his elevation to the Third Circuit.

Court of appeals service 

Greenaway was nominated by President Barack Obama on June 19, 2009, to a seat on the United States Court of Appeals for the Third Circuit vacated by Judge Samuel Alito, who was elevated to the Supreme Court of the United States on January 31, 2006. On February 9, 2010, he was confirmed by the Senate by an 84–0 vote. He received his commission on February 12, 2010. On February 7, 2023, it was announced that he is going to retire from the bench on June 15, 2023.

Awards 

Greenaway was the 1997 recipient of the Columbia University Medal of Excellence, the 1999 recipient of the Garden State Bar Association’s Distinguished Jurist Award, a 2003 recipient of Columbia’s John Jay Award, a 2007 recipient of the Thurgood Marshall College Fund Award of Excellence, and the 2007 recipient of the Roger M. Yancey Award from the Garden State Bar Association.  In 2006, Greenaway delivered the commencement address at the Cardozo School of Law.  In 1998, Greenaway delivered the Class Day address at Columbia College’s commencement.  He also presented Rutgers Law School’s Weintraub Lecture in 1998 (published as Judicial Decision Making and the External Environment, 51 Rutgers L. Rev. 181 (1998)).  In November 1996, he received the New Jersey Corporate Counsel Association’s Distinguished Service Award.  In 2019, the Birmingham City University (UK), Centre for American Legal Studies, in conjunction with the Birmingham (UK) Law Society, instituted the Judge Joseph A. Greenaway, Jr. Lecture Series on Law and Justice, in which Greenaway delivered the inaugural lecture.

Personal life 
Greenaway is married to Columbia University professor Valerie Purdie Greenaway. He is currently a trustee of Columbia University.

See also
 Barack Obama Supreme Court candidates
 List of African-American federal judges
 List of African-American jurists

References

Sources 

1957 births
Living people
20th-century American judges
20th-century American lawyers
21st-century American judges
African-American judges
African-American lawyers
Assistant United States Attorneys
British emigrants to the United States
Cardozo School of Law faculty
Columbia College (New York) alumni
Columbia University faculty
Harvard Law School alumni
Harvard Law School faculty
Judges of the United States Court of Appeals for the Third Circuit
Judges of the United States District Court for the District of New Jersey
New Jersey lawyers
People from London
Rutgers School of Law–Newark faculty
United States court of appeals judges appointed by Barack Obama
United States district court judges appointed by Bill Clinton